Novye Cheryomushki (. English: New Cheryomushki) is a train station on the Kaluzhsko-Rizhskaya Line of the Moscow Metro. It was opened as the final segment of the Kaluzhskiy radius on 13 October 1962, and served as a terminus for two years.

Design
Novye Cheryomushki was built to the standard column tri-span design and features pillars faced with pinkish marble and tiled walls accented with two horizontal stripes of reddish-brown tile. The architects were M. Markovskiy and A. Ryzhkov.

The entrances to the station are located on Profsoyuznaya Street at its intersection with Garibaldi Street.

Traffic
The station has a daily passenger traffic of 52,800 people.

Gallery

Moscow Metro stations
Railway stations in Russia opened in 1962
Kaluzhsko-Rizhskaya Line
Railway stations located underground in Russia